Arizona Zervas, (born April 19, 1995) is an American rapper and singer. He is widely known for his song "Roxanne", which reached number four on the Billboard Hot 100 in 2019, after being prominently featured in Spotify playlists. The success of the single led him to tour nationwide in 2019, and in November of that same year he signed with Columbia Records. "Roxanne" also topped the charts in New Zealand, and reached the top 10 in the UK, Australia, and several other countries.

Career
Zervas released his first song in the eleventh grade. His debut single "Don't Hit My Line" was released in 2016. This was followed up by the release of more than 30 singles - with nearly every song totaling 1 million streams on Spotify. A debut three-song EP Living Facts was released in 2018.

Zervas released his first charting song "Roxanne" on October 10, 2019. It quickly became a viral hit. The song reached number 1 on Spotify's United States Top 50 chart on November 8, becoming the first track by an unsigned, fully independent artist to top the chart. The song subsequently debuted at number 34 on the US Billboard Hot 100, as well as debuting at number 24 on the UK Singles Chart and reached number 1 in New Zealand, becoming his first number one on any national chart. The song sparked a bidding war among labels, and on November 15, 2019, it was reported that Zervas had signed with Columbia Records. This marks Columbia's second major signing of a viral star in 2019 following the label's deal with Lil Nas X, thanks to his breakout hit "Old Town Road".

According to Billboard magazine, Zervas has performed more than 50 shows across the United States, including at New York's Webster Hall.

On May 8, 2020, Zervas released his single "24". It is the follow-up to his hit single "Roxanne". He then released his single "RIP" on September 25, 2020.

Discography

Extended plays

Singles

As lead artist

Other charted songs

References

1995 births
Living people
21st-century American male musicians
People from Hagerstown, Maryland
American male rappers
American hip hop singers
American contemporary R&B singers
21st-century American rappers
21st-century American singers
American male singer-songwriters
Pop rappers
American hip hop musicians
Rappers from Maryland
Singer-songwriters from Maryland
American people of Greek descent